Senior is a surname and occasional given name. Notable people with the name include:

Surname
 Abraham Senior (1412-1493), last crown rabbi of Castile
 Anna Senior, Australian costume designer
 Brian Senior (born 1953), British bridge player
 Clarence Senior (1903–1974), American socialist political activist
 John Senior (born 1960), MBE, TD British TA major and founder of Heroes Welcome UK.
 John Senior (1923-1999), American professor and Catholic author, a leader of the Pearson Integrated Humanities Program
 John L. Senior (1879–1946), American sports administrator
 Julio Ximenes Senior (1901–1975), Brazilian scientist and Army general
 Justin Senior (born 1994), American football player
 Keith Senior (born 1976), English rugby league player
 Moira Senior (born 1976), field hockey player from New Zealand
 Nadine Senior (1931-2016), British dance educator
 Nassau William Senior (1790–1864), English economist
 Peter Senior (born 1959), Australian golfer
 Robert Senior (born 1954), British businessperson

Given name
 Senior Sachs (1816–1892), Russo-French Hebrew scholar

English-language surnames